Watch house may refer to:

 Guardhouse, a building used to house personnel and security equipment
 Watchhouse, a small prison attached to a police station
 The Watch House, 1977 novel
 Watch House Village, village in Ireland
 Watch House Terrace, row of terraced house in Australia
 Watch House Battery, 19th century artillery battery